GrainCorp Limited is an Australian commodity trading company listed on the Australian Securities Exchange. The company's core business is the receiving and storage of grain and related commodities. It also provides logistics and markets these commodities.

The company was founded by the Government of New South Wales as a public sector agency, Government Grain Elevator (later the Grain Elevators Board), in 1917. It was formed to transport grain from local collection points located on railways throughout the grain-producing regions of New South Wales. It was later known as the Grain Handling Authority. It was privatised in 1992 with a majority of shares being transferred to grain growers, and listed on the Australian Securities Exchange in March 1998.

GrainCorp's operations have subsequently extended into other Australian states by amalgamations with other grain handling operations. In July 2000 it merged with its Victorian equivalent, Vicgrain. The company operates an extensive network of rail-linked storages across south-east Australia, as well as seven export terminals in Brisbane, Geelong, Gladstone, Mackay, Newcastle, Port Kembla and Portland.

In November 2009 GrainCorp expanded into North America through the purchase of the United Malt Holdings group of companies. In July 2011, GrainCorp agreed to buy maltster GermanMalt GmbH & Co, extending its reach into Europe.

Having purchased a 20% stake in the company, in 2013 Archer Daniels Midland launched a take over offer. Although cleared by the Australian Competition & Consumer Commission, the bid was disallowed by Federal Treasurer Joe Hockey, citing that it would not be in Australia's national interest.

In May 2009, eighteen 48 class locomotives and 180 grain wagons were transferred by the Government of New South Wales at no cost. They continued to be operated by Pacific National. In Queensland, services are contracted out to Watco Australia.

Demerger of United Grain Corp
In early 2020, GrainCorp announced that the demerger of its malt business and created the United Malt Group. The new company was also listed on the ASX on the 2nd of April 2020.

Controversies
In October 2019 GrainCorp was found guilty by the New South Wales Environment Protection Authority of breaches of fumigation protocol at its Port Kembla facility. The breaches were self-reported in February 2018 and GrainCorp was fined $40,200.

References

Agriculture companies of Australia
Food and drink companies based in Sydney
Companies listed on the Australian Securities Exchange
Grain companies
Grain industry of Australia
Australian companies established in 1917